Lewis Field is a sport stadium in Hays, Kansas.  The facility is primarily used by Fort Hays State University for college football team. The stadium is also the primary home field for Hays High School and Thomas More Prep-Marian.   It was named to honor William Alexander Lewis, president of Fort Hays State University from 1913 to 1933.

References

College football venues
Fort Hays State Tigers football
American football venues in Kansas
Buildings and structures in Ellis County, Kansas
Hays, Kansas